Asteridiella is a genus of fungi in the family Meliolaceae. The genus was first described by Daniel McAlpine in 1897, who differentiated it from various other fungal genera:

Species and subspecies include some 738 taxa:
Asteridiella perseae
Asteridiella selaginellae
Asteridiella solani

References

External links 
Index Fungorum

Fungal plant pathogens and diseases
Meliolaceae
Sordariomycetes genera
Taxa named by Daniel McAlpine
Taxa described in 1897